Niram Haskall Withee (June 21, 1827July 1, 1887) was an American businessman, Republican politician, and Wisconsin pioneer.  He served two years in the Wisconsin State Assembly, representing Clark County and neighboring areas.  He is the namesake of Withee, Wisconsin.

Biography

Born in Norridgewock, Maine, Withee settled in the village of North La Crosse, Wisconsin, in 1852. He was in the logging and lumber business. In 1868, Withee served as president of the village of North La Crosse. In 1870, Withee settled on a farm in the town of Hixon, Clark County, Wisconsin and also owned a house in La Crosse, Wisconsin. He was one of the owners of the Island Mill Lumber Company and was also involved in the railroad business. Withee served on the Clark County Board of Supervisors and was county treasurer. In 1879 and 1880, Withee served in the Wisconsin State Assembly as a Republican. Withee died at his home in La Crosse, Wisconsin. The Wisconsin village and town of Withee was named in his honor.

Personal life and family
Niram Withee was a son of Zachariah Withee and his wife Polly ( Longley).  Zachariah Withee was a veteran of the War of 1812 and received land as a reward for his service.  Levi Withee was one of seven children.  His younger brother Levi Withee also worked as a lumberman in the La Crosse area and was a member of the Wisconsin Legislature.

Niram Withee married Louisa Adelaide Wood.  They had five children, though two died in infancy.

References

External links
 

1827 births
1887 deaths
People from Norridgewock, Maine
People from Clark County, Wisconsin
Politicians from La Crosse, Wisconsin
Businesspeople from Wisconsin
County supervisors in Wisconsin
Mayors of places in Wisconsin
Republican Party members of the Wisconsin State Assembly
19th-century American politicians
19th-century American businesspeople